Miho Nakayama Complete DVD Box is a box set by Japanese entertainer Miho Nakayama. Released through King Records on July 24, 2003, the box set compiles all 15 of Nakayama's video releases on DVD format, plus the new video Camino de Flamenco. Due to copyright issues, the performance of "Hero" was omitted from the Miho Nakayama Concert Tour '95: F disc.

Track listing

References

External links
 
 

2003 compilation albums
2003 video albums
Miho Nakayama compilation albums
Japanese-language compilation albums
Japanese-language video albums
King Records (Japan) compilation albums